Alan Tower Waterman (June 4, 1892 – November 30, 1967) was an American physicist.

Biography
Born in Cornwall-on-Hudson, New York, he grew up in Northampton, Massachusetts. His father was a professor of physics at Smith College. Alan also became a physicist, doing his undergraduate and doctoral work at Princeton University from which he obtained his Ph.D. in 1916.

He joined the faculty of the University of Cincinnati, and married Vassar graduate Mary Mallon. (sister of H. Neil Mallon) there in August 1917. He later became a professor at Yale University, and moved to North Haven, Connecticut in 1929. During World War II, he took leave of absence from Yale to become director of field operations for the Office of Scientific Research and Development and the family moved to Cambridge, MA. He continued his government work and became deputy chief of the Office of Naval Research. In 1950, he was appointed by President Truman as first director of the U.S. National Science Foundation (NSF) Waterman was awarded the Public Welfare Medal from the National Academy of Sciences in 1960. He served as director until 1963, when he retired and was subsequently awarded the Presidential Medal of Freedom.

Alan and Mary had six children: Alan Jr, an atmospheric physicist who taught at Stanford University, Neil, Barbara, Anne, and Guy, writer, climber, and conservationist. A daughter Mary died in childhood.

Possessed of a gentle nature, Alan Waterman was known for his calm and reasoned point of view. He believed in public service. Besides his scientific talents, he was an accomplished musician, revealing his sense of humor by walking the corridors of the National Science Foundation playing his bagpipes. He had a fine voice and singing together was a family ritual. An avid outdoorsman, Dr. Waterman canoed the rivers and lakes of northern Maine during extensive summer trips in the 1930s and 1940s. He was accompanied by his sons and colleagues, in particular Karl Compton, then president of MIT. Dr. Waterman was known to say that becoming a licensed Maine Guide meant possibly more to him than his NSF appointment.

In 1961, he was chosen as one of 50 outstanding Americans of meritorious performance in the fields of endeavor, to be honored as a Guest of Honor to the first annual Banquet of the Golden Plate in Monterey, California. Honor was awarded by vote of the National Panel of Distinguished Americans of the Academy of Achievement.

The crater Waterman on the Moon is named after him, as is Mount Waterman in the Hughes Range of Antarctica. Since 1975, the National Science Foundation has annually issued the Alan T. Waterman Award (named in Waterman's honor) to a promising young researcher.

Waterman died on November 30, 1967.

Tributes 
A month later after his death, President Lyndon B. Johnson made a statement to commemorate him.

Leland John Haworth also paid his respects in his statement:

References

Sources
 Brown, Chip (2004). Good Morning Midnight. Riverhead Books. .
 Waterman, Laura (2005). Losing the Garden: The Story of a Marriage. Shoemaker & Hoard. .
England, James Merton (1983). A Patron for Pure Science: The National Science Foundation's Formative Years, 1945-57. National Science Foundation. .

External links

National Science Foundation biography page for Waterman.

Waterman, Alan T.
Waterman, Alan T.
Waterman, Alan T.
Waterman, Alan T.
People from Cornwall-on-Hudson, New York
People from Northampton, Massachusetts
People from North Haven, Connecticut
Presidential Medal of Freedom recipients
Scientists from New York (state)
Fellows of the American Physical Society
Kennedy administration personnel
Eisenhower administration personnel
Truman administration personnel